Aberfoyle is an unincorporated community in Hunt County, Texas, United States. The community is located fifteen miles to the northeast of Greenville.

References 

Unincorporated communities in Hunt County, Texas
Unincorporated communities in Texas